Carrissoa is a genus of flowering plants in the legume family, Fabaceae. It belongs to the subfamily Faboideae. There is only one species within the genus : Carrissoa angolensis Baker f., native to Africa, mainly from Angola.

The genus takes its name from Portuguese botanist Luís Wittnich Carrisso.

References 

Phaseoleae
Fabaceae genera